Rochefort is a surname.

Notable people with the surname include:
Christiane Rochefort, French writer
Damon Rochefort, Welsh scriptwriter, songwriter and producer
Jean Rochefort (1930–2017), French actor
Joseph Rochefort (1898–1976), American naval officer and cryptanalyst
Line Rochefort, Canadian scientist specializing in peatland ecology
Nick Rochefort, American comedian, car salesman, and antique shop owner
Victor Henri Rochefort, Marquis de Rochefort-Luçay, French politician

Fictional characters:
Comte de Rochefort, a character in Alexandre Dumas's d'Artagnan romances
Belze Rochefort, a character in manga/anime Black Cat
Lili Rochefort, a character in the Tekken fighting game series

French-language surnames